The Golconda Group is a geologic group in Illinois. It preserves fossils dating back to the Carboniferous period.

See also

 List of fossiliferous stratigraphic units in Illinois

References
 

Carboniferous Illinois